is a 2010 Japanese film directed by Kōki Yoshida. It was shown at the Forum section of the 61st Berlin International Film Festival.

Cast
Kaho Minami
Tomorowo Taguchi
Tomohiro Kaku

References

External links
Review at Midnight Eye
 

2010 films
Films directed by Kōki Yoshida
Japanese drama films
2010s Japanese films